Shayna (Yiddish: שיינע; Polish: Szejna) is a feminine name of Yiddish origin, meaning "beautiful" or "lovely", and evocative of the Yiddish phrase "אַ שיינע מיידל" ("a shayne maydel", or "a lovely girl"). Its Hebrew equivalent is Yaffa (יפה) or Yafit (יַפִית); during the years following the Holocaust, the name Shayna (and its Arabic cognate, Jamila) was often Hebraicized to Yaffa upon immigrating to Israel or, outside Israel, as a post-Holocaust distancing of diasporic heritage.

People named Shaina or Shayna

Shaina Magdayao, (born 1989) Filipina actress, dancer, singer and model
Shaina Sandoval, (born 1992) American actress
Shayna Baszler, martial artist
Shayna Fox (born 1984), American voice actress
Shayna Hubers (born 1991), perpetrator of the murder of Ryan Poston
Shayna Levine, actress
Shayna Nackoney (born 1982), synchronized swimmer
Shayna Richardson (born 1984), Missouri skydiver who survived a fall
Shayna Rose (born 1983), soap opera actress
 Shayne-Feygl Szapiro (Szejne Fejgl Szapiro-Michalewicz, Dina Blond, 1887-1985), member of the Jewish Labour Bund in Poland and a prolific Yiddish translator

References

Feminine given names
Yiddish words and phrases